Gomersal railway station served the town of Gomersal, West Yorkshire, England, from 1900 to 1953 on the Leeds New Line.

History 
The station was opened on 1 October 1900 by the London and North Western Railway. It closed on 5 October 1953. Most of the site is now a road.

References

External links 

Disused railway stations in West Yorkshire
Former London and North Western Railway stations
Railway stations in Great Britain opened in 1900
Railway stations in Great Britain closed in 1953
1900 establishments in England
1953 disestablishments in England